Zelen may refer to:

Ljiljana Zelen Karadžić (born 1945), the wife of the former Bosnian Serb leader Radovan Karadžić
Marvin Zelen, statistician
Zelen's design, experimental design for randomized clinical trials proposed by statistician Marvin Zelen